The women's singles table tennis event at the 2018 Asian Games took place from 30 August to 1 September 2018 at the Jakarta International Expo. Seeds were based on the individual ITTF World Ranking lists published in August 2018 with a maximum of 2 players per country.

Schedule
All times are Western Indonesia Time (UTC+07:00)

Results

Finals

Top half

Section 1

Section 2

Section 3

Section 4

Bottom half

Section 5

Section 6

Section 7

Section 8

References

External links
Table tennis at the 2018 Asian Games

Women's singles